"Have You Had Your Love Today" is a new jack swing song by The O'Jays, released as a single in 1989. The song features hip-hop artist Jaz-O, who was an EMI labelmate with the group at the time.

Reception
The single would be the group's tenth and final number one on the Black Singles chart, and the group's first release on their new record label, EMI. "Have You Had Your Love Today" did not chart on the Hot 100.

Charts

Weekly charts

Year-end charts

References

1989 singles
1989 songs
The O'Jays songs
New jack swing songs
Songs written by Jaz-O
EMI Records singles